Computer tan hoax refers to a trick website set up by skin cancer charity Skcin in 2009 to spread awareness about skin cancer through the Internet. The fake company was promoted by leaflets, street marketing and online ads, which directed users to the website where they were directed to download software.

History 

Launched on 3 February 2009, and originally planned to run for seven days, the site received more than 30,000 hits in the first 24 hours and over 1 million hits in the first two months. The premise of the hoax is that software downloaded from the website recalibrates the user's computer monitor or mobile phone to produce ultraviolet rays, after promising to give the user a skin analysis. Described as a "revolutionary new online tanning service" that promises an all-year tan, upon activating the "five-minute free tan trial", bars from a sunbed flash on the screen followed by the message "Don't be fooled, UV exposure can kill", and then by images depicting the victims of sun damage.

The advertisement was shown on 75 screens in 11 stations on the London Underground, where it was projected to be seen by up to 1.7 million commuters. It was also seeded online, where several bloggers joined in on the hoax. In response to the number of hits received by the website, a spokesperson for the charity described it as:

Skcin was set up in memory of Karen Clifford, a  resident of Nottingham, England, who died of skin cancer in 2005.

References

External links
Skcin (The Karen Clifford Skin Cancer Charity) - Official site

Internet hoaxes
2009 in England
Educational charities based in the United Kingdom
Health charities in the United Kingdom
Cancer awareness
Sun tanning
2009 hoaxes
Hoaxes in the United Kingdom